Millheim Historic District is a national historic district located at Millheim, Centre County, Pennsylvania.  The district includes 176 contributing buildings in the central business district and surrounding residential areas of Millheim.  Among the types of residential building types present are the simple "I"-type, Georgian "I"-type, Victorianized "I"-type, connected or double type, gable-end oriented type, bungalow, and eclectic cube type. Notable non-residential buildings include the Millheim School, silk mill (c. 1900), and mill (1817).

It was added to the National Register of Historic Places in 1986.

References

Historic districts on the National Register of Historic Places in Pennsylvania
Colonial Revival architecture in Pennsylvania
Historic districts in Centre County, Pennsylvania
National Register of Historic Places in Centre County, Pennsylvania